Leonard Feather's Encyclopedia of Jazz (aka Encyclopedia of Jazz, Vol. 1) is a compilation album of pieces by Oliver Nelson and others assembled by Leonard Feather. It was recorded in 1965 and 1966 for Verve Records. In 2006, Mosaic Records released all the Oliver Nelson tracks, together with some unissued pieces recorded at the same session, on the second CD of the compilation Oliver Nelson: The Argo, Verve and Impulse Big Band Studio Sessions. Some of them were also included at the time on Leonard Feather Presents the Sound of Feeling and the Sound of Oliver Nelson (V6-8743, 1968).

Track listing
Encyclopedia of Jazz, Vol. 1

"Blues for Eileen"
"C Jam Blues"
"O.G.D. (Road Song)"
"St. Louis Blues"
"I Remember Bird"
"John Brown's Blues"

Oliver Nelson: The Argo, Verve and Impulse Big Band Studio Sessions (CD 2)
"St. Louis Blues" - 6:10
"I Remember Bird" - 6:28
"Ricardo's Dilemma" - 2:33
"Patterns for Orchestra" - 3:13
"The Sidewalks of New York" [aka "East Side, West Side"] - 6:30
"Greensleeves" - 2:28
"John Brown's Blues" - 3:22
"Twelve Tone Blues" - 3:06

Recorded on November 3 (#1-4) and November 4 (#5-8), 1966.

Personnel
Burt Collins, Joe Newman, Ernie Royal, Clark Terry, Joe Wilder, Snooky Young - trumpet, flugelhorn
Jimmy Cleveland, J.J. Johnson - trombone
Bob Brookmeyer - valve trombone
Tony Studd - bass trombone
Phil Woods - alto sax, clarinet
Jerry Dodgion - alto sax, clarinet, flute
Jerome Richardson, Zoot Sims - tenor sax, flute, soprano sax
Danny Bank - baritone sax
Al Dailey - piano
Eric Gale - guitar
Ron Carter - bass
Grady Tate - drums
Phil Kraus - percussion

References

1967 compilation albums
Verve Records albums
Oliver Nelson albums